Magnolia Place is a historic home located near Morganton, Burke County, North Carolina.  The original section was built about 1818, and is a two-story, five bay by two bay, brick structure in the Federal style.  Attached at the rear is a one bay by two bay temple form Greek Revival style addition built about 1850.  It features a long full-height porch.  The addition was built by Clarke Moulton Avery, second child born to Isaac Thomas Avery, master of Swan Ponds. In 1841, he married Elizabeth Tilghman Walton, daughter of Thomas George Walton, master of Creekside.

It was listed on the National Register of Historic Places in 1973.

References

Houses on the National Register of Historic Places in North Carolina
Greek Revival houses in North Carolina
Federal architecture in North Carolina
Houses completed in 1868
Houses in Burke County, North Carolina
National Register of Historic Places in Burke County, North Carolina